Steven Ellery (born 22 August 1974 in Melbourne) is a retired Australian racing driver known from V8 Supercars.

Racing history

Early career
Ellery started racing in karts before graduation to Formula Ford in 1992. After running near the front of the Formula Ford pack racing a Van Diemen in 1993 Ellery moved his family-run team into the Australian Manufacturers' Championship (later known as the Australian Super Touring Championship), driving first a Ford Sierra in 1994 then a BMW 318i in 1995. Ellery's appearance in an ex-Glenn Seton Racing Ford Sierra at the Amaroo Park Australian Touring Car Championship (ATCC) round in 1994 remains the most recent entry of a non-V8 powered car in the championship.

ATCC / V8 Supercars
After two Bathurst 1000 starts in 1993 and 1994, Ellery entered the ATCC full-time in 1996 with his eponymous team, finishing 15th in the championship. He then joined Longhurst Racing for the post-season endurance races in 1996, finishing 4th at the Sandown 500 and 3rd at the Bathurst 1000 with Tony Longhurst. He continued with the team in 1997, as the team expanded to two cars with a second Ford EL Falcon. After a falling out with Longhurst, he then raced a Holden Young Lions Holden VS Commodore, prepared by Gibson Motorsport, in 1998.

His time away from the family team proved to be short-lived with Ellery again choosing to team up with his father Bruce from 1999 onwards, the team contesting a partial campaign of the championship with backing from family company Chelgrave Contracting. Ellery did however take a pole position at the non-championship event supporting the Gold Coast Indy 300. Ellery joined Dick Johnson Racing for the 1999 endurance events, now part of the championship, and co-driver Paul Radisich was leading the 1999 FAI 1000 with under 20 laps to go before a flat tyre put them out of the race.

In 2000 Ellery, now with Supercheap Auto backing, won the second race of the Sandown round, what proved to be his only championship race victory. Ellery continued with his team until 2004, with a best finish of 9th in the championship in 2001. The team's highlight was a double podium for Ellery and Luke Youlden at the two major endurance races in 2003, second at Sandown and third at Bathurst. In 2005, Ellery was selected to partner Craig Lowndes at Triple Eight Race Engineering in a two-year deal. While Lowndes mounted a championship challenge, Ellery only finished 13th in the championship with one podium at the 2005 Bathurst 1000. He was replaced after only one year for 2006 by Jamie Whincup and never returned as a full-time driver in the series.

Over the next three years, Ellery drove with Paul Morris Motorsport and Garry Rogers Motorsport as an endurance co-driver before stepping away from the sport.

Other racing
Ellery entered the first four rounds of the 2007 Australian Carrera Cup Championship before dropping out of the championship.

Business
Ellery is the chief executive officer of his family labour contracting business.

Career results

Supercars Championship results
(Races in bold indicate pole position) (Races in italics indicate fastest lap)

Complete Bathurst 1000 results

References

1974 births
Australian Touring Car Championship drivers
Living people
Racing drivers from Melbourne
Supercars Championship drivers
Dick Johnson Racing drivers
Garry Rogers Motorsport drivers